The Harbin Y-11 (NATO reporting name Chan) is a high wing twin-engine piston utility and  geological survey aircraft built by Harbin Aircraft Manufacturing Corporation (HAMC).

Development

A requirement for a twin-engined light utility transport was issued by the Chinese government in November 1974. The Y-11 was proposed in April 1974, and the design was begun in January 1975. Design of the Y-11, under Xiong Wenjie, was completed at Harbin in June 1975 and prototype construction started immediately. The static test article completed its test cycle on 19 December 1975 and the first flight of the prototype followed soon after on 30 December 1975. Production started on 3 April 1977 with at least fifty aircraft known to have been built before production stopped in favour of the Harbin Y-12.

Variants
 Y-11 : Twin-engined STOL utility transport aircraft, designed for agriculture and geological survey.
 Y-11B : (I) is Fitted with advanced avionics and powered by 350 hp Teledyne -Continental TSIO-550-B air-cooled flat six piston engines. Type (II) was canceled. Later, the only flyable one was used for geological survey.
 Y-11 agricultural aircraft : Fitted with a hopper or tank in the cabin on the centre of gravity, dispensing chemicals through a dust spreader, spraybars or atomisers on the wing trailing edges.
 Y-11 Geological Survey aircraft : At least one aircraft fitted with a large toroidal sensor on the port wing-tip and a cigar shaped sensor on the starboard wing-tip.
 Y-11T : The initial designation of the Prototype Harbin Y-12, a redesigned plane fitted with Pratt & Whitney PT6A-11 turboprop engines driving three-bladed Hartzell HC-B3TN-3B propellers.

Operators

China Flying-Dragon Special Aviation Corp.

Former Operators

CAAC Airlines operated 41 Harbin Y-11 from 1976 to 1988.

Incidents And Accidents
 On June 19, 1999, a Harbin Y-11 operated by Xinjiang General Aviation crash-landed after it struck power cables during a crop spraying mission.

Specifications

References
Notes

External links 

 Specs & Photo at Flugzeuginfo.net

Y-011
1970s Chinese civil utility aircraft
High-wing aircraft
Aircraft first flown in 1975
STOL aircraft
Twin piston-engined tractor aircraft